Dangerous Age is the eighth studio album by hard rock band Bad Company. The album was released on August 23, 1988. It was their second album with Brian Howe as lead vocalist and first with Steve Price credited as bass guitarist. It was produced and largely co-written by Terry Thomas. It helped bring the group back into the spotlight, with major radio airplay for the tracks "No Smoke Without a Fire" (#4), "One Night" (#9) and "Shake It Up" (#9) all reaching the top 10 on Billboard's Album Rock Tracks chart.

Track listing
All songs written by Brian Howe and Terry Thomas, except where noted.

Personnel
Bad Company
 Brian Howe – vocals, saxophone
 Mick Ralphs – guitar, keyboards, backing vocals
 Terry Thomas - guitar, keyboards, backing vocals
 Steve Price – bass
 Simon Kirke – drums

References

Bad Company albums
1988 albums
Atco Records albums